AACS may refer to:

 Advanced Access Content System, a standard for content distribution and digital rights management
 AACS encryption key controversy
 American Association of Christian Schools, an organization that unifies individual Christian schools and statewide Christian school associations
 Annapolis Area Christian School, a Christian school in Maryland, United States
 Attitude and Articulation Control Subsystems, used to orient space probes relative to a fixed point